Metallizing is the general name for the technique of coating metal on the surface of objects. Metallic coatings may be decorative, protective or functional.

Techniques for metallization started as early as mirror making. In 1835, Justus von Liebig discovered the process of coating a glass surface with metallic silver, making the glass mirror one of the earliest items being metallized. Plating other non-metallic objects grew rapidly with introduction of ABS plastic. Because a non-metallic object tends to be a poor electrical conductor, the object's surface must be made conductive before plating can be performed. The plastic part is first etched chemically by a suitable process, such as dipping in a hot chromic acid-sulfuric acid mixture. The etched surface is sensitised and activated by first dipping in tin(II) chloride solution, then palladium chloride solution. The processed surface is then coated with electroless copper or nickel before further plating. This process gives useful (about 1 to 6 kgf/cm or 10 to 60 N/cm or 5 to 35 lbf/in) adhesion force, but is much weaker than actual metal-to-metal adhesion strength.

Vacuum metallizing involves heating the coating metal to its boiling point in a vacuum chamber, then letting condensation deposit the metal on the substrate's surface. Resistance heating, electron beam, or plasma heating is used to vaporize the coating metal. Vacuum metallizing was used to deposit aluminum on the large glass mirrors of reflecting telescopes, such as with the Hale telescope.

Thermal spray processes are often referred to as metallizing. Metals applied in such a manner provide corrosion protection to steel for decades longer than paint alone. Zinc and aluminum are the most commonly used materials for metallizing steel structures.

Cold sprayable metal technology is a metallizing process that seamlessly applies cold sprayable or puttyable metal to almost any surface. The composite metal consists of two (waterbased binder) or three different ingredients: metal powder, binder and hardener.

The mixture of the ingredients is cast or sprayed on the substrate at room temperature. The desired effect and the necessary final treatment define the thickness of the layer, which normally varies between 80 and 150 µm.

See also
 List of telescope parts and construction
 Thin film deposition 
 Electroplating
 Sputtering
 Chemical vapor deposition
 Electroless deposition

References

 
 

Industrial processes
Coatings